The Australian cricket team toured the West Indies from 27 May to 15 June 2015. The tour consisted of one first-class warm-up match and two Test matches. On 8 April 2015, the West Indies Cricket Board brought forward the date of the two Test matches by two days "due to a number of logistical challenges beyond [their] control". Australia won the 2-match Test series 2–0 and therefore retained the Frank Worrell Trophy.

Squads
Australia announced their squad on 31 March 2015. They included three uncapped players, spinner Fawad Ahmed, wicket-keeper Peter Nevill and batsman Adam Voges. West Indies announced a training squad on 24 May 2015. Shivnarine Chanderpaul was not selected in the 12-man training squad, a decision that was criticised by Brian Lara. However, former fast-bowler Michael Holding backed the selectors saying that "I don't believe that cricketers should just get a series for getting a series sake". The full squad was announced on 30 May, with Chanderpaul ultimately being dropped. Australia's Chris Rogers was ruled out of the series after suffering a concussion while practicing in the nets before the first Test.

Tour match

WICB President's XI v Australians

Test series (Frank Worrell Trophy)

1st Test

2nd Test

References

External links
Series home at ESPN Cricinfo

2015
2015 in Australian cricket
International cricket competitions in 2015
2015 in West Indian cricket